Justice Walker may refer to:

 A. S. Walker, justice of the Texas Supreme Court
 D. A. Walker, justice of the Supreme Court of Georgia
 David Walker (Arkansas politician), justice of the Arkansas Supreme Court
 David S. Walker, justice of the Florida Supreme Court
 Abram Joseph Walker, chief justice of the Supreme Court of Alabama
 Richard Wilde Walker, associate justice of the Alabama Supreme Court
 Moses B. Walker, justice of the Texas Supreme Court
 Pinkney H. Walker, chief justice of the Supreme Court of Illinois
 Platt D. Walker, justice of the North Carolina Supreme Court
 Reuben E. Walker, justice of the New Hampshire Supreme Court
 Richard Wilde Walker Jr., associate justice of the Alabama Supreme Court
 Robert F. Walker, justice of the Supreme Court of Missouri
 Ruel C. Walker, justice of the Texas Supreme Court
 William H. Walker (Vermont judge), justice of the Vermont Supreme Court

See also
Judge Walker (disambiguation)